Derek V. Smith was the CEO of ChoicePoint from 1997 until its acquisition by Reed Elsevier. Previously, Smith was an executive for Equifax. He holds degrees from Penn State and Georgia Tech.

In 2005, Derek came under scrutiny alongside Doug C. Curling, ChoicePoint's president, for earning $16.6 million by selling ChoicePoint stock following a major security breach. In 2009, he became a minority owner of the Atlanta Falcons. He also serves as chairman of the Game of Golf Institute and on the board of directors for Geeknet and the Georgia Aquarium.

References

Pennsylvania State University alumni
Georgia Tech alumni
Year of birth missing (living people)
Living people
American chief executives